Tanner James Smith (born March 30, 1990) is a former American professional basketball player and is currently an assistant coach for Stephen F. Austin.

Smith played professionally for MHP Riesen Ludwigsburg in the Basketball Bundesliga in Germany and Landstede Basketball in the Netherlands. He played for Clemson University.

Smith has been noted by such sources as The Post and Courier, The Times and Democrat, and The Atlanta Journal-Constitution for founding Tanner's Totes, an organization that helps to cheer up children and teenagers with cancer through donations of large tote bags filled with toys and other recreational items. Tanner's Totes have delivered to hospitals in 25 states across the US. Over 3000 totes have been delivered. Smith has also been interviewed by ESPN in print and in televised interviews and has been featured on the ABC special "Everyday Health".

Tanner Smith graduated in December 2011 with a degree in Marketing and finished playing his final season at Clemson as a graduate student.

College career
Tanner Smith started three seasons as a Guard on the Clemson Tigers men's basketball team. He committed to Clemson University on September 13, 2007 under coach Oliver Purnell over offers from the University of Oregon, the University of Michigan, Vanderbilt University, the University of Georgia, Auburn University, and the University of Cincinnati.

He played high school basketball at Wesleyan School in Norcross, Georgia. He was rated as a 3-star prospect in high school and as the #22 small forward in the nation by Scout.com and given a Scout Grade of 87 on ESPN.com. He was also rated 16th in the state of Georgia by Rivals.com, two spots lower than his teammate and roommate at Clemson, Andre Young.

When considering schools, Smith chose Clemson mainly because of location; It was far enough away from home for him to be independent, but still close enough that his parents would be able to come to his games. Conference also played a part in his decision. Clemson is in the Atlantic Coast Conference (ACC), which Dana O'Neil says is "a league Tanner remembers watching as a kid."

Statistics

Awards
Throughout his college career, Tanner Smith has earned numerous awards, including but not limited to the 2011 C. J. Spiller Award given to a student-athlete chosen by the Clemson University student body for exceptional representation of the school through athletics and academics; the Mr. Effort Award his junior year given to the athlete that exhibits the most "hustle"; and the 2011 Tiger Pride Award, given to the Clemson athlete who best embodies the term "student athlete". He is also a four-time member of the All-ACC Academic Team, making him only the second player in Clemson history to make the team all four years.

Professional career
Smith played his first professional season in the Dutch Basketball League, playing for Landstede Basketbal from Zwolle. In July 2013, Smith signed with MHP RIESEN Ludwigsburg in Germany.

Coaching career
Tanner Smith began coaching in 2014 serving as the Graduate Assistant for Mississippi State basketball team.  He became the Director of Operations at Charlotte 49ers for two seasons before being promoted to a full-time assistant coach in 2017.

In 2018, Tanner Smith joined Mississippi State as Director of Basketball Operations. In 2019, he joined Kennesaw State as Assistant coach.

Honors
 Landstede Basketbal
DBL All-Star (1): 2013

Tanner's Totes
Tanner's Totes is a non-profit organization that works to cheer up children and teens with cancer undergoing long-term treatment in the hospital through the donation of large tote bags filled with new, non-food items. It is an IRS-approved, publicly supported 501(c)(3) organization. In the fourth grade, Tanner Smith was assigned to write a paper about his three wishes. In it, he wrote that he wished for a golden retriever, to become a professional basketball player, and to help kids with cancer. Tanner's Totes was established two years later, when Smith was in the sixth grade, after he reiterated his wish to cheer up kids with cancer.

References

External links
Dutch League profile

1990 births
Living people
American expatriate basketball people in Germany
American expatriate basketball people in the Netherlands
American men's basketball players
Basketball coaches from Georgia (U.S. state)
Basketball players from Georgia (U.S. state)
Charlotte 49ers men's basketball coaches
Clemson Tigers men's basketball players
Dutch Basketball League players
Kennesaw State Owls men's basketball coaches
Landstede Hammers players
Mississippi State Bulldogs men's basketball coaches
People from Alpharetta, Georgia
Shooting guards
Sportspeople from Fulton County, Georgia